The 2018 FA Women's Cup Final was the 48th final of the FA Women's Cup, England's primary cup competition for women's football teams. The showpiece event was the 25th to be played directly under the auspices of the Football Association (FA) and was named the SSE Women's FA Cup Final due to sponsorship reasons. 

The final was contested between Arsenal Ladies and Chelsea Ladies on 5 May 2018 at Wembley Stadium in London. The match was broadcast on BBC1. Chelsea won the match 3–1 in front of a record crowd of 45,423 to clinch their second title.

Match

Details

In popular culture
Ahead of the game, Subbuteo launched an all-women game set for the first time.

References

External links
 

Cup
Women's FA Cup finals
May 2018 sports events in the United Kingdom
2018 sports events in London
FA Women's Cup Final, 2018
FA Women's Cup Final, 2018